Nangishlishma of Kish (also written as  Nanjiclicma) was the third Sumerian king in the First Dynasty of Kish,who reigned for 670 years according to some versions of the Sumerian king list. His name does not appear in Early Dynastic inscriptions, meaning that he is unlikely to have been a real historical person.

References 

|-

Kings of Kish
Sumerian kings

Mythological kings